The 2014 Chicago White Sox season was the club's 115th season in Chicago and 114th in the American League. They finished in fourth place in the division, 17 games behind the first place Tigers.

Regular season

Season standings

American League Central

American League Wild Card

Record vs. opponents

Detailed records and runs scored/allowed

Game log

|- align="center" bgcolor="#bbffbb"
| 1 || March 31 || Twins || 3:10pm || 5–3 || Sale (1–0) || Nolasco (0–1) || Lindstrom (1) || 1–0 || 2:35 || 37,422 || W1
|- align="center" bgcolor="#bbffbb"
| 2 || April 2 || Twins || 1:10pm || 7–6 (11) || Belisario  || Deduno (0–1) || — || 2–0 || 4:19 || 10,625 || W2
|- align="center" bgcolor="#ffbbbb"
| 3 || April 3 || Twins || 1:10pm || 9–10 || Thielbar (1–0) || Lindstrom  || Perkins (1) || 2–1 || 3:42 || 11,056 || L1
|- align="center" bgcolor="#ffbbbb"
| 4 || April 4 || @ Royals || 3:10pm || 5–7 || Guthrie (1–0) || Johnson  || Holland (1) || 2–2 || 3:37 || 40,103 || L2
|- align="center" bgcolor="#ffbbbb"
| 5 || April 5 || @ Royals || 1:10pm || 3–4 || Davis (1–1) || Downs (0–1) || Holland (2) || 2–3 || 2:59 || 21,463 || L3
|- align="center" bgcolor="#bbffbb"
| 6 || April 6 || @ Royals || 1:10pm || 5–1 || Sale (2–0) || Shields (0–1) || — || 3–3 || 2:49 ||29,760 || W1
|- align="center" bgcolor="#ffbbbb"
| 7 || April 7 || @ Rockies || 7:40pm || 1–8 || Lyles (2–0) || Paulino (0–1) || — || 3–4 || 2:42 || 22,550 || L1
|- align="center" bgcolor="#bbffbb"
| 8 || April 8 || @ Rockies || 7:40pm || 15–3 || Quintana (1–0) || Morales (0–1) || — || 4–4 || 3:10 || 25,393 || W1
|- align="center" bgcolor="#ffbbbb"
| 9 || April 9 || @ Rockies || 2:10pm || 4–10 || Brothers (1–0) || Downs (0–2) || — || 4–5 || 3:23 || 22,745 || L1
|- align="center" bgcolor="#bbffbb"
| 10 || April 10 || Indians || 7:10pm || 7–3 || Danks (1–0) || Salazar (0–1) || — || 5–5 || 2:52 || 11,116 || W1
|- align="center" bgcolor="#bbffbb"
| 11 || April 11 || Indians || 7:10pm || 9–6 || Sale (3–0) || Carrasco (0–2) || — || 6–5 || 3:28 || 13,605 || W2
|- align="center" bgcolor="#ffbbbb"
| 12 || April 12 || Indians || 1:10pm || 6–12 || Outman (2–0) || Belisario (1–1) || — || 6–6 || 3:28 || 27,332 || L1
|- align="center" bgcolor="#bbffbb"
| 13 || April 13 || Indians || 1:10pm || 4–3 || Lindstrom (1–1) || Axford (0–1) || — || 7–6 || 3:18 || 14,281 || W1
|- align="center" bgcolor="#bbffbb"
| 14 || April 15 || Red Sox || 7:10pm || 2–1 || Webb (1–0) || Badenhop (0–2) || — || 8–6 || 3:36 || 13,402 || W2
|- align="center" bgcolor="#ffbbbb"
| 15 || April 16 || Red Sox || 7:10pm || 4–6 (14) || Capuano (1–0) || Garcia (0–1) || Badenhop (1) || 8–7 || 5:17 || 13,302 || L1
|- align="center" bgcolor="#ffbbbb"
| 16 || April 17 || Red Sox || 7:10pm || 1–3 || Lester (2–2) || Belisario (1–2) || Uehara (3) || 8–8 || 2:54 || 17,454 || L2
|- align="center" bgcolor="#ffbbbb"
| 17 || April 18 || @ Rangers || 7:05pm || 0–12 || Pérez (3–0) || Paulino (0–2) || — || 8–9 || 2:41 || 40,671 || L3
|- align="center" bgcolor="#ffbbbb"
| 18 || April 19 || @ Rangers || 7:05pm || 3–6 || Lewis (1–1) || Quintana (1–1) || Soria (3) || 8–10 || 2:49 || 44,811 || L4
|- align="center" bgcolor="#bbffbb"
| 19 || April 20 || @ Rangers || 2:05pm || 16–2 || Johnson  || Ross (1–1) || — || 9–10 || 3:16 || 35,402 || W1
|- align="center" bgcolor="#bbffbb"
| 20 || April 21 || @ Tigers || 6:08pm || 3–1 || Danks (2–0) || Sánchez (0–2) || Lindstrom (2) || 10–10 || 3:06 || 24,997 || W2
|- align="center" bgcolor="#ffbbbb"
| 21 || April 22 || @ Tigers || 6:08pm || 6–8 || Verlander (3–1) || Leesman (0–1) || Chamberlain (1) || 10–11 || 3:22 || 24,976 || L1
|- align="center" bgcolor="#bbffbb"
| 22 || April 23 || @ Tigers || 6:08pm || 6–4 || Rienzo (1–0) || Reed (0–1) || Lindstrom (3) || 11–11 || 2:51 || 23,451 || W1
|- align="center" bgcolor="#ffbbbb"
| 23 || April 24 || @ Tigers || 12:08pm || 4–7 || Szherzer (2–1) || Quintana (1–2) || Nathan (4) || 11–12 || 3:14 || 28,514 || L1
|- align="center" bgcolor="#bbffbb"
| 24 || April 25 || Rays || 7:10pm || 9–6 || Lindstrom (2–1) || Balfour (0–1) || — || 12–12 || 4:04 || 17,210 || W1
|- align="center" bgcolor="#ffbbbb"
| 25 || April 26 || Rays || 6:10pm || 0–4 || Ramos (1–1) || Danks (2–1) || — || 12–13 || 3:11 || 22,412 || L1
|- align="center" bgcolor="#bbffbb"
| 26 || April 27 || Rays || 1:10pm || 9–2 || Carroll (1–0) || Price (3–2) || — || 13–13 || 2:55 || 17,313 || W1
|- align="center" bgcolor="#bbffbb"
| 27 || April 28 || Rays || 7:10pm || 7–3 || Rienzo (2–0) || Odorizzi (1–3) || — || 14–13 || 3:19 || 11,268 || W2
|- align="center" bgcolor="#ffbbbb"
| 28 || April 29 || Tigers || 7:10pm || 3–4 || Chamberlain (1–1) || Belisario (1–3) || Nathan (5) || 14–14 || 3:04 || 17,023 || L1
|- align="center" bgcolor="#ffbbbb"
| 29 || April 30 || Tigers || 1:10pm || 1–5 || Scherzer (3–1) || Noesí (0–2) || — || 14–15 || 3:03 || 15,157 || L2
|-

|- align="center" bgcolor="#ffbbbb"
| 30 || May 2 || @ Indians || 6:05pm || 5–12 || Salazar (1–3) || Danks (2–2) || — || 14–16 || 3:26 || 15,518 || L3
|- align="center" bgcolor="#ffbbbb"
| 31 || May 3 || @ Indians || 5:05pm || 0–2 || Masterson (1–1) || Carroll (1–1) || Axford (9) || 14–17 || 2:36 || 15,834 || L4
|- align="center" bgcolor="#bbffbb"
| 32 || May 4 || @ Indians || 12:05pm || 4–3 || Webb (2–0) || Axford (0–2) || Lindstrom (4) || 15–17 || 2:55 || 13,455 || W1
|- align="center" bgcolor="#bbffbb"
| 33 || May 5 || @ Cubs || 7:05pm || 3–1 (12) || Webb (3–0) || Grimm (1–1) || Lindstrom (5) || 16–17 || 3:51 || 33,146 || W2
|- align="center" bgcolor="#bbffbb"
| 34 || May 6 || @ Cubs || 7:05pm || 5–1 || Putnam (1–0) || Ramirez (0–1) || — || 17–17 || 3:30 || 34,305 || W3
|- align="center" bgcolor="#bbffbb"
| 35 || May 7 || Cubs || 7:10pm || 8–3 || Danks (3–2) || Wood (2–4) || — || 18–17 || 3:03 || 21,075 || W4
|- align="center" bgcolor="#ffbbbb"
| 36 || May 8 || Cubs || 7:10pm || 5–12 || Schlitter (2–0) || Carroll (1–2) || — || 18–18 || 4:07 || 26,332 || L1
|- align="center" bgcolor="#bbffbb"
| 37 || May 9 || Diamondbacks || 7:10pm || 9–3 || Rienzo (3–0) || McCarthy (1–6) || — || 19–18 || 2:45 || 19,118 || W1
|- align="center" bgcolor="#ffbbbb"
| 38 || May 10 || Diamondbacks || 6:10pm || 3–4 || Miley (3–3) || Quintana (1–3) || Reed (11) || 19–19 || 2:58 || 24,634 || L1
|- align="center" bgcolor="#ffbbbb"
| 39 || May 11 || Diamondbacks || 1:10pm || 1–5 || Anderson (1–0) || Noesí (0–3) || — || 19–20 || 3:10 || 18,612 || L2
|- align="center" bgcolor="#ffbbbb"
| 40 || May 12 || @ Athletics || 9:05pm || 4–5 || Chavez (3–1) || Danks (3–3) || Doolittle (2) || 19–21 || 2:57 || 10,120 || L3
|- align="center" bgcolor="#ffbbbb"
| 41 || May 13 || @ Athletics || 9:05pm || 0–11 || Pomeranz (3–1) || Carroll (1–3) || — || 19–22 || 2:50 || 13,826 || L4
|- align="center" bgcolor="#bbffbb"
| 42 || May 14 || @ Athletics || 2:35pm || 4–2 || Belisario (2–3) || Abad (0–1) || Lindstrom (6) || 20–22 || 2:57 || 18,035 || W1
|- align="center" bgcolor="#bbffbb"
| 43 || May 16 || @ Astros || 7:10pm || 7–2 || Quintana (2–3) || McHugh (2–2) || — || 21–22 || 3:31 || 17,529 || W2
|- align="center" bgcolor="#ffbbbb"
| 44 || May 17 || @ Astros || 3:10pm || 5–6 || Cosart (3–3) || Noesí (0–4) || Qualls (3) || 21–23 || 3:26 || 20,612 || L1
|- align="center" bgcolor="#ffbbbb"
| 45 || May 18 || @ Astros || 1:10pm || 2–8 || Peacock (1–4) || Danks (3–4) || — || 21–24 || 2:36 || 21,532 || L2
|- align="center" bgcolor="#bbffbb"
| 46 || May 19 || @ Royals || 7:10pm || 7–6 || Putnam (2–0) || Vargas (4–2) || Petricka (1) || 22–24 || 3:16 || 16,462 || W1
|- align="center" bgcolor="#bbffbb"
| 47 || May 20 || @ Royals || 7:10pm || 7–6 || Rienzo (4–0) || Ventura (2–4) || Belisario (1) || 23–24 || 3:19 || 14,900 || W2
|- align="center" bgcolor="#ffbbbb"
| 48 || May 21 || @ Royals || 7:10pm || 1–3 || Davis (3–1) || Quintana (2–4) || Holland (13) || 23–25 || 2:41 || 17,576 || L1
|- align="center" bgcolor="#bbffbb"
| 49 || May 22 || Yankees || 7:10pm || 3–2 || Sale (4–0) || Phelps (1–1) || Belisario (2) || 24–25 || 2:45 || 21,677 || W1
|- align="center" bgcolor="#bbffbb"
| 50 || May 23 || Yankees || 7:10pm || 6–5 || Webb (4–0) || Robertson (0–1) || — || 25–25 || 3:52 || 27,091 || W2
|- align="center" bgcolor="#ffbbbb"
| 51 || May 24 || Yankees || 1:10pm || 3–4 (10) || Betances (3–0) || Putnam (2–1) || Robertson (10) || 25–26 || 2:56 || 33,413 || L1
|- align="center" bgcolor="#ffbbbb"
| 52 || May 25 || Yankees || 1:10pm || 1–7 || Tanaka (7–1) || Rienzo (4–1) || — || 25–27 || 3:17 || 39,142 || L2
|- align="center" bgcolor="#bbffbb"
| 53 || May 26 || Indians || 1:10pm || 6–2 || Quintana (3–4) || Tomlin (3–2) || Downs (1) || 26–27 || 3:22 || 17,075 || W1
|- align="center" bgcolor="#bbffbb"
| 54 || May 27 || Indians || 7:10pm || 2–1 || Carroll (2–3) || Masterson (2–4) || Belisario (3) || 27–27 || 3:05 || 14,237 || W2
|- align="center" bgcolor="#bbffbb"
| 55 || May 28 || Indians || 7:10pm || 3–2 || Belisario (3–3) || Shaw (1–1) || — || 28–27 || 2:46 || 14,228 || W3
|- align="center" bgcolor="#ffbbbb"
| 56 || May 30 || Padres || 7:10pm || 1–4 || Kennedy (4–6) || Danks (3–5) || Street (16) || 28–28 || 2:51 || 25,342 || L1
|- align="center" bgcolor="#ffbbbb"
| 57 || May 31 || Padres || 1:10pm || 2–4 || Ross (6–4) || Rienzo (4–2) || Street (17) || 28–29 || 3:16 || 19,025 || L2
|-

|- align="center" bgcolor="#bbffbb"
| 58 || June 1 || Padres || 1:10pm || 4–1 || Sale (5–0) || Stults (2–6) || — || 29–29 || 2:08 || 23,185 || W1
|- align="center" bgcolor="#ffbbbb"
| 59 || June 2 || @ Dodgers || 9:10pm || 2–5 || Kershaw (4–2) || Quintana (3–5) || Jansen (17) || 29–30 || 2:41 || 37,336 || L1
|- align="center" bgcolor="#bbffbb"
| 60 || June 3 || @ Dodgers || 9:10pm || 4–1 || Noesí (1–4) || Haren (5–4) || Belisario (4) || 30–30 || 3:05 || 44,477 || W1
|- align="center" bgcolor="#bbffbb"
| 61 || June 4 || @ Dodgers || 9:10pm || 2–1 || Danks (4–5) || Beckett (3–3) || Belisario (5) || 31–30 || 3:03 || 45,540 || W2
|- align="center" bgcolor="#ffbbbb"
| 62 || June 6 || @ Angels || 9:05pm || 4–8 || Weaver (7–4) || Rienzo (4–3) || — || 31–31 || 3:10 || 38,521 || L1
|- align="center" bgcolor="#ffbbbb"
| 63 || June 7 || @ Angels || 9:05pm || 5–6 || Rasmus (1–0) || Petricka (0–1) || Frieri (9) || 31–32 || 2:53 || 39,089 || L2
|- align="center" bgcolor="#ffbbbb"
| 64 || June 8 || @ Angels || 2:35pm || 2–4 || Wilson (7–5) || Quintana (3–6) || Frieri (10) || 31–33 || 3:01 || 35,793 || L3
|- align="center" bgcolor="#bbffbb"
| 65 || June 9 || Tigers || 7:10pm || 6–5 || Noesí (2–4) || Porcello (8–4) || Belisario (6) || 32–33 || 3:13 || 18,803 || W1
|- align="center" bgcolor="#bbbbbb"
| -- || June 10 || Tigers || 7:10pm || colspan=8| PPD, RAIN; rescheduled for Aug 30
|- align="center" bgcolor="#bbffbb"
| 66 || June 11 || Tigers || 7:10pm || 8–2 || Danks (5–5) || Verlander (6–6) || — || 33–33 || 3:17 || 18,424 || W2
|- align="center" bgcolor="#ffbbbb"
| 67 || June 12 || Tigers || 7:10pm || 0–4 || Scherzer (8–2) || Sale (5–1) || — || 33–34 || 2:52 || 20,626 || L1
|- align="center" bgcolor="#ffbbbb"
| 68 || June 13 || Royals || 7:10pm || 2–7 || Guthrie (3–6) || Quintana (3–7) || — || 33–35 || 3:22 || 22,773 || L2
|- align="center" bgcolor="#ffbbbb"
| 69 || June 14 || Royals || 1:10pm || 1–9 || Duffy (4–5) || Noesí (2–5) || — || 33–36 || 3:03 || 24,527 || L3
|- align="center" bgcolor="#ffbbbb"
| 70 || June 15 || Royals || 1:10pm || 3–6 || Shields (8–3) || Rienzo (4–4) || Holland (20) || 33–37 || 3:10 || 29,152 || L4
|- align="center" bgcolor="#bbffbb"
| 71 || June 17 || Giants || 7:10pm || 8–2 || Danks (6–5) || Cain (1–5) || — || 34–37 || 2:42 || 25,278 || W1
|- align="center" bgcolor="#bbffbb"
| 72 || June 18 || Giants || 1:10pm || 7–6 || Sale (6–1) || Hudson (7–3) || Belisario (7) || 35–37 || 3:12 || 20,059 || W2
|- align="center" bgcolor="#ffbbbb"
| 73 || June 19 || @ Twins || 7:10pm || 2–4 || Fien (4–4) || Petricka (0–2) || Perkins (18) || 35–38 || 2:43 || 31,195 || L1
|- align="center" bgcolor="#ffbbbb"
| 74 || June 20 || @ Twins || 7:10pm || 4–5 || Perkins (3–0) || Webb (4–1) || — || 35–39 || 3:16 || 32,071 || L2
|- align="center" bgcolor="#ffbbbb"
| 75 || June 21 || @ Twins || 1:10pm || 3–4 || Correia (4–8) || Rienzo (4–5) || Perkins (19) || 35–40 || 3:07 || 32,647 || L3
|- align="center" bgcolor="#ffbbbb"
| 76 || June 22 || @ Twins || 1:10pm || 5–6 || Hughes (8–3) || Danks (6–6) || Burton (1) || 35–41 || 2:55 || 30,491 || L4
|- align="center" bgcolor="#ffbbbb"
| 77 || June 23 || @ Orioles || 6:05pm || 4–6 || Brach (1–0) || Belisario (3–4) || — || 35–42 || 3:08 || 17,931 || L5
|- align="center" bgcolor="#bbffbb"
| 78 || June 24 || @ Orioles || 6:05pm || 4–2 || Quintana (4–7) || González (4–5) || Belisario (8) || 36–42 || 3:09 || 20,596 || W1
|- align="center" bgcolor="#ffbbbb"
| 79 || June 25 || @ Orioles || 6:05pm || 4–5 (12) || Hunter (2–1) || Webb (4–2) || — || 36–43 || 4:03 || 22,020 || L1
|- align="center" bgcolor="#ffbbbb"
| 80 || June 26 || @ Blue Jays || 6:07pm || 0–7 || Happ (7–4) || Carroll (2–4) || — || 36–44 || 3:00 || 23,248 || L2
|- align="center" bgcolor="#bbffbb"
| 81 || June 27 || @ Blue Jays || 6:07pm || 5–4 || Danks (7–6) || Dickey (6–7) || Petricka (2) || 37–44 || 2:58 || 24,173 || W1
|- align="center" bgcolor="#bbffbb"
| 82 || June 28 || @ Blue Jays || 12:07pm || 4–3 || Sale (7–1) || McGowan (4–3) || Putnam (1) || 38–44 || 2:58 || 39,623 || W2
|- align="center" bgcolor="#bbffbb"
| 83 || June 29 || @ Blue Jays || 12:07pm || 4–0 || Quintana (5–7) || Buehrle (10–5) || — || 39–44 || 2:32|| 33,177 || W3
|- align="center" bgcolor="#bbbbbb"
| -- || June 30 || Angels || 7:10pm || colspan=8| PPD, RAIN; rescheduled for July 1
|-

|- align="center" bgcolor="#ffbbbb"
| 84 || July 1 || Angels || 4:10pm || 4–8 || Richards (9–2) || Noesí (2–6) || Smith (8) || 39–45 || 2:54 || N/A || L1
|- align="center" bgcolor="#ffbbbb"
| 85 || July 1 || Angels || 7:10pm || 5–7 || Weaver (9–6) || Carroll (2–5) || Smith (9) || 39–46 || 3:08 || 20,233 || L2
|- align="center" bgcolor="#bbffbb"
| 86 || July 2 || Angels || 7:10pm || 3–2 || Putnam (3–1) || Morin (2–2) || — || 40–46 || 2:49 || 18,207 || W1
|- align="center" bgcolor="#bbffbb"
| 87 || July 4 || Mariners || 6:10pm || 7–1 || Sale (8–1) || Elías (7–7) || — || 41–46 || 2:28 || 30,297 || W2
|- align="center" bgcolor="#ffbbbb"
| 88 || July 5 || Mariners || 1:10pm || 2–3 (14) || Wilhelmsen (1–1) || Belisario (3–5) || Rodney (25) || 41–47 || 4:38 || 23,113 || L1
|- align="center" bgcolor="#bbffbb"
| 89 || July 6 || Mariners || 1:10pm || 1–0 || Noesí (3–6) || Walker (1–1) || Petricka (3) || 42–47 || 2:49 || 23,370 || W1
|- align="center" bgcolor="#bbffbb"
| 90 || July 7 || @ Red Sox || 6:10pm || 4–0 || Carroll (3–5) || Buchholz (3–5) || — || 43–47 || 2:55 || 35,114 || W2
|- align="center" bgcolor="#bbffbb"
| 91 || July 8 || @ Red Sox || 6:10pm || 8–3 || Danks (8–6) || Workman (1–3) || — || 44–47 || 3:11 || 35,345 || W3
|- align="center" bgcolor="#ffbbbb"
| 92 || July 9 || @ Red Sox || 6:10pm || 4–5 || Uehara (5–2) || Guerra (0–1) || — || 44–48 || 2:54 || 36,218 || L1
|- align="center" bgcolor="#ffbbbb"
| 93 || July 10 || @ Red Sox || 3:05pm || 3–4 (10) || Miller (3–5) || Belisario (3–6) || — || 44–49 || 3:22 || 37,547 || L2
|- align="center" bgcolor="#ffbbbb"
| 94 || July 11 || @ Indians || 6:05pm || 4–7 || Kluber (9–6) || Noesí (3–7) || Allen (11) || 44–50 || 3:16 || 24,652 || L3
|- align="center" bgcolor="#bbffbb"
| 95 || July 12 || @ Indians || 2:05pm || 6–2 || Carroll (4–5) || McAllister (3–5) || — || 45–50 || 3:10 || 23,837 || W1
|- align="center" bgcolor="#ffbbbb"
| 96 || July 13 || @ Indians || 12:05pm || 2–3 || Shaw (4–1) || Guerra (0–2) || Allen (12) || 45–51 || 3:00 || 18,070 || L1
|-  style="background:#bbb;"
|colspan=12| All–Star Break (July 14–17)
|- align="center" bgcolor="#bbffbb"
| 97 || July 18 || Astros || 7:10pm || 3–2 || Webb (5–2) || Feldman (4–7) || Putnam (2) || 46–51 || 2:50 || 28,777 || W1
|- align="center" bgcolor="#bbffbb"
| 98 || July 19 || Astros || 6:10pm || 4–3 || Noesí (4–7) || Keuchel (9–6) || Putnam (3) || 47–51 || 3:18 || 28,210 || W2
|- align="center" bgcolor="#ffbbbb"
| 99 || July 20 || Astros || 1:10pm || 7–11 || Sipp (2–1) || Webb (5–3) || — || 47–52 || 3:39 || 26,256 || L1
|- align="center" bgcolor="#bbffbb"
| 100 || July 21 || Royals || 7:10pm || 3–1 || Sale (9–1) || Guthrie (5–9) || Petricka (4) || 48–52 || 2:46 || 18,888 || W1
|- align="center" bgcolor="#ffbbbb"
| 101 || July 22 || Royals || 7:10pm || 1–7 || Chen (2–2) || Carroll (4–6) || — || 48–53 || 3:35 || 20,428 || L1
|- align="center" bgcolor="#ffbbbb"
| 102 || July 23 || Royals || 1:10pm || 1–2 || Davis (6–2) || Putnam (3–2) || Holland (26) || 48–54 || 3:03 || 23,811 || L2
|- align="center" bgcolor="#bbffbb"
| 103 || July 24 || @ Twins || 7:10pm || 5–2 || Noesí (5–7) || Hughes (10–7) || Petricka (5) || 49–54 || 2:46 || 32,952 || W1
|- align="center" bgcolor="#bbffbb"
| 104 || July 25 || @ Twins || 7:10pm || 9–5 || Danks (9–6) || Correia (5–13) || — || 50–54 || 2:51 || 28,728 || W2
|- align="center" bgcolor="#bbffbb"
| 105 || July 26 || @ Twins || 6:10pm || 7–0 || Sale (10–1) || Darnell (0–1) || — || 51–54 || 2:30 || 33,005 || W3
|- align="center" bgcolor="#ffbbbb"
| 106 || July 27 || @ Twins || 1:10pm || 3–4 || Burton (2–2) || Belisario (3–7) || Perkins (25) || 51–55 || 2:44 || 27,818 || L1
|- align="center" bgcolor="#bbffbb"
| 107 || July 29 || @ Tigers || 6:08pm || 11–4 || Quintana (6–7) || Sánchez (7–5) || — || 52–55 || 3:16 || 40,032 || W1
|- align="center" bgcolor="#ffbbbb"
| 108 || July 30 || @ Tigers || 6:08pm || 2–7 || Scherzer (13–3) || Noesí (5–8) || — || 52–56 || 2:49 || 37,193 || L1
|- align="center" bgcolor="#bbffbb"
| 109 || July 31 || @ Tigers || 12:08pm || 7–4 || Belisario (4–7) || Soria (1–4) || Petricka (6) || 53–56 || 4:01 || 41,306 || W1
|-

|- align="center" bgcolor="#bbffbb"
| 110 || August 1 || Twins || 7:10pm || 10–8 || Guerra (1–2) || Fien (5–5) || Petricka (7) || 54–56 || 3:47 || 28,060 || W2
|- align="center" bgcolor="#ffbbbb"
| 111 || August 2 || Twins || 6:10pm || 6–8 || Pressly (1–0) || Belisario (4–8) || Perkins (27) || 54–57 || 2:58 || 27,446 || L1
|- align="center" bgcolor="#ffbbbb"
| 112 || August 3 || Twins || 1:10pm || 3–16 || Gibson (10–8) || Guerra (1–3) || — || 54–58 || 4:01 || 23,471 || L2
|- align="center" bgcolor="#bbffbb"
| 113 || August 4 || Rangers || 7:10pm || 5–3 (7) || Noesí (6–8) || Martinez (1–8) || — || 55–58 || 2:28 || 17,040 || W1
|- align="center" bgcolor="#ffbbbb"
| 114 || August 5 || Rangers || 7:10pm || 0–16 || Lewis (8–8) || Danks (9–7) || — || 55–59 || 2:56 || 21,827 || L1
|- align="center" bgcolor="#ffbbbb"
| 115 || August 6 || Rangers || 1:10pm || 1–3 || Tepesch (4–7) || Sale (10–2) || Feliz (4) || 55–60 || 2:57 || 18,898 || L2
|- align="center" bgcolor="#ffbbbb"
| 116 || August 7 || @ Mariners || 9:10pm || 3–13 || Elías (9–9) || Carroll (4–7) || — || 55–61 || 3:08 || 18,740 || L3
|- align="center" bgcolor="#ffbbbb"
| 117 || August 8 || @ Mariners || 9:10pm || 1–4 || Iwakuma (10–6) || Quintana (6–8) || Rodney (32) || 55–62 || 2:43 || 23,223 || L4
|- align="center" bgcolor="#bbffbb"
| 118 || August 9 || @ Mariners || 8:10pm || 2–1 || Surkamp (1–0) || Rodney (1–5) || Petricka (8) || 56–62 || 2:50 || 40,122 || W1
|- align="center" bgcolor="#ffbbbb"
| 119 || August 10 || @ Mariners || 3:10pm || 2–4 || Leone (5–2) || Danks (9–8) || Rodney (33) || 56–63 || 2:50 || 27,236 || L1 
|- align="center" bgcolor="#bbffbb"
| 120 || August 12 || @ Giants || 9:15pm || 3–2 (10) || Putnam (4–2) || Casilla (1–2) || —  || 57–63 || 3:12 || 42,317 || W1
|- align="center" bgcolor="#ffbbbb"
| 121 || August 13 || @ Giants || 2:45pm || 1–7 || Peavy (2–12) || Quintana (6–9) || — || 57–64 || 2:44 || 41,725 || L1
|- align="center" bgcolor="#bbffbb"
| 122 || August 15 || Blue Jays || 7:10pm || 11–5 || Noesí (7–8) || Stroman (7–4) || — || 58–64 || 3:22 || 22,739 || W1
|- align="center" bgcolor="#ffbbbb"
| 123 || August 16 || Blue Jays || 6:10pm || 3–6 || Cecil (1–3) || Lindstrom (2–2) || Janssen (19) || 58–65 || 2:54 || 29,420 || L1
|- align="center" bgcolor="#bbffbb"
| 124 || August 17 || Blue Jays || 1:10pm || 7–5 || Carroll (5–7) || Hutchison (8–11) || Petricka (9) || 59–65 || 3:00 || 25,761 || W1
|- align="center" bgcolor="#ffbbbb"
| 125 || August 18 || Orioles || 7:10pm || 2–8 || Norris (11–7) || Sale (10–3) || — || 59–66 || 3:02 || 17,686 || L1
|- align="center" bgcolor="#ffbbbb"
| 126 || August 19 || Orioles || 7:10pm || 1–5 || Tillman (10–5) || Quintana (6–10) || — || 59–67 || 2:42 || 13,307 || L2
|- align="center" bgcolor="#ffbbbb"
| 127 || August 20 || Orioles || 7:10pm || 3–4 || Chen (13–4) || Noesí (7–9) || Britton (27) || 59–68 || 2:37 || 15,137 || L3
|- align="center" bgcolor="#ffbbbb"
| 128 || August 22 || @ Yankees || 6:05pm || 3–4 || Robertson (2–4) || Webb (5–4) || — || 59–69 || 3:23 || 43,811 || L4
|- align="center" bgcolor="#ffbbbb"
| 129 || August 23 || @ Yankees || 12:05pm || 3–5 || Kuroda (9–8) || Carroll (5–8) || Robertson (34) || 59–70 || 2:54 || 47,594 || L5
|- align="center" bgcolor="#ffbbbb"
| 130 || August 24 || @ Yankees || 12:05pm || 4–7 (10) || Huff (4–1) || Petricka (0–3) || — || 59–71 || 3:17 || 43,366 || L6
|- align="center" bgcolor="#ffbbbb"
| 131 || August 26 || Indians || 7:10pm || 6–8 (10) || Shaw (5–3) || Petricka (0–4) || — || 59–72 || 3:48 || 12,462 || L7
|- align="center" bgcolor="#bbffbb"
| 132 || August 27 || Indians || 7:10pm || 3–2 || Noesí (8–9) || Kluber (13–8) || Putnam (4) || 60–72 || 3:07 || 11,976 || W1
|- align="center" bgcolor="#ffbbbb"
| 133 || August 28 || Indians || 7:10pm || 2–3 || Carrasco (6–4) || Danks (9–9) || Allen (18) || 60–73 || 3:18 || 13,016 || L1
|- align="center" bgcolor="#ffbbbb"
| 134 || August 29 || Tigers || 7:10pm || 1–7 || Verlander (12–11) || Carroll (5–9) || — || 60–74 || 3:28 || 17,071 || L2
|- align="center" bgcolor="#bbffbb"
| 135 || August 30 || Tigers || 1:10pm || 6–3 || Sale (11–3) || Scherzer (15–5) || Petricka (10) || 61–74 || 2:54 || 20,556 || W1
|- align="center" bgcolor="#ffbbbb"
| 136 || August 30 || Tigers || 7:10pm || 4–8 || Ryan (1–0) || Bassitt (0–1) || — || 61–75 || 3:23 || 23,723 || L1
|- align="center" bgcolor="#bbffbb"
| 137 || August 31 || Tigers || 1:10pm || 6–2 || Quintana (7–10) || Porcello (15–9) || — || 62–75 || 3:04 || 26,336 || W1
|-

|- align="center" bgcolor="#bbffbb"
| 138 || September 2 || @ Twins || 7:10pm || 6–3 (10) || Webb (6–4) || Oliveros (0–1) || Petricka (11) || 63–75 || 3:35 || 23,719 || W2
|- align="center" bgcolor="#ffbbbb"
| 139 || September 3 || @ Twins || 7:10pm || 4–11 || May (1–4) || Danks (9–10) || — || 63–76 || 3:12 || 21,778 || L1
|- align="center" bgcolor="#ffbbbb"
| 140 || September 5 || @ Indians || 6:05pm || 1–2 (10) || Lee (1–1) || Cleto (0–1) || — || 63–77 || 3:13 || 15,531 || L2
|- align="center" bgcolor="#ffbbbb"
| 141 || September 6 || @ Indians || 6:05pm || 1–3 || Kluber (15–9) || Putnam (4–3) || — || 63–78 || 2:46 || 17,367 || L3
|- align="center" bgcolor="#ffbbbb"
| 142 || September 7 || @ Indians || 12:05pm || 0–2 || Carrasco (7–4) || Carroll (5–10) || Allen (19) || 63–79 || 2:36 || 17,957 || L4
|- align="center" bgcolor="#bbffbb"
| 143 || September 8 || Athletics || 7:10pm || 5–4 (12) || Guerra (2–3) || Chavez (8–8) || — || 64–79 || 3:38 || 15,517 || W1
|- align="center" bgcolor="#ffbbbb"
| 144 || September 9 || Athletics || 7:10pm || 2–11 || Lester (14–10) || Danks (9–11) || — || 64–80 || 3:19 || 12,150 || L1
|- align="center" bgcolor="#bbffbb"
| 145 || September 10 || Athletics || 7:10pm || 2–1 || Putnam (5–3) || Gregerson (4–4) || Petricka (12) || 65–80 || 3:15 || 15,046 || W1
|- align="center" bgcolor="#bbffbb"
| 146 || September 11 || Athletics || 1:10pm || 1–0 || Sale (12–3) || Kazmir (14–8) || Petricka (13) || 66–80 || 2:18 || 12,314 || W2
|- align="center" bgcolor="#bbbbbb"
| -- || September 12 || Twins || 7:10pm || colspan=8| PPD, RAIN; rescheduled for September 13
|- align="center" bgcolor="#bbffbb"
| 147 || September 13 || Twins || 3:10pm || 5–1 || Quintana (8–10) || Hughes (15–10) || — || 67–80 || 2:38 || N/A || W3
|- align="center" bgcolor="#bbffbb"
| 148 || September 13 || Twins || 7:10pm || 7–6 || Petricka (1–4) || Perkins (3–3) || — || 68–80 || 3:34 || 20,106 || W4
|- align="center" bgcolor="#ffbbbb"
| 149 || September 14 || Twins || 1:10pm || 4–6 || May (3–4) ||  Noesí (8–10) || Perkins (34) || 68–81 || 2:43 || 17,044 || L1
|- align="center" bgcolor="#ffbbbb"
| 150 || September 15 || @ Royals || 7:10pm || 3–4 || Davis (9–2) || Petricka (1–5) || — || 68–82 || 3:18 || 21,390 || L2
|- align="center" bgcolor="#bbffbb"
| 151 || September 16 || @ Royals || 7:10pm || 7–5 || Surkamp (2–0) || Herrera (3–3) || Putnam (5) || 69–82 || 4:16 || 28,904 || W1
|- align="center" bgcolor="#ffbbbb"
| 152 || September 17 || @ Royals || 7:10pm || 2–6 || Ventura (13–10) || Sale (12–4) || — || 69–83 || 2:50 || 26,425 || L1
|- align="center" bgcolor="#bbffbb"
| 153 || September 19 || @ Rays || 6:10pm || 4–3 || Quintana (9–10) || Hellickson (1–4) || Putnam (6) || 70–83 || 3:29 || 17,540 || W1
|- align="center" bgcolor="#ffbbbb"
| 154 || September 20 || @ Rays || 6:10pm || 1–3 || Archer (10–8) || Noesí (8–11) || McGee (18) || 70–84 || 3:05 || 21,830 || L1
|- align="center" bgcolor="#bbffbb"
| 155 || September 21 || @ Rays || 12:40pm || 10–5 || Danks (10–11) || Karns (1–1) || — || 71–84 || 3:26 || 21,270 || W1
|- align="center" bgcolor="#bbffbb"
| 156 || September 22 || @ Tigers || 6:08pm || 2–0 || Bassitt (1–1) || Lobstein (1–1) || Petricka (14) || 72–84 || 2:36 || 30,758 || W2
|- align="center" bgcolor="#ffbbbb"
| 157 || September 23 || @ Tigers || 6:08pm || 3–4 || Nathan (5–4) || Petricka (1–6) || — || 72–85 || 3:19 || 33,213 || L1
|- align="center" bgcolor="#ffbbbb"
| 158 || September 24 || @ Tigers || 12:08pm || 1–6 || Verlander (15–12) || Guerra (2–4) || — || 72–86 || 3:04 || 36,810 || L2
|- align="center" bgcolor="#ffbbbb"
| 159 || September 25 || Royals || 7:10pm || 3–6 || Herrera (4–3) || Quintana (9–11) || Holland (45) || 72–87 || 3:06 || 19,587 || L3
|- align="center" bgcolor="#ffbbbb"
| 160 || September 26 || Royals || 7:10pm || 1–3 || Guthrie (13–11) || Noesí (8–12) || Holland (46) || 72–88 || 2:41 || 27,416 || L4
|- align="center" bgcolor="#bbffbb"
| 161 || September 27 || Royals || 6:10pm || 5–4 || Danks (11–11) || Duffy (9–12) || Guerra (1) || 73–88 || 3:19 || 38,160 || W1
|- align="center" bgcolor="#ffbbbb"
| 162 || September 28 || Royals || 1:10pm || 4–6 || Coleman (1–0) || Webb (6–5) || Coleman (1) || 73–89 || 3:34 || 32,266 || L1
|-

Roster

Player stats

Batting
Note: G = Games played; AB = At bats; R = Runs scored; H = Hits; 2B = Doubles; 3B = Triples; HR = Home runs; RBI = Runs batted in; BB = Base on balls; SO = Strikeouts; AVG = Batting average; SB = Stolen bases

Pitching
Note: W = Wins; L = Losses; ERA = Earned run average; G = Games pitched; GS = Games started; SV = Saves; IP = Innings pitched; H = Hits allowed; R = Runs allowed; ER = Earned runs allowed; HR = Home runs allowed; BB = Walks allowed; K = Strikeouts

Farm system

References
General

Specific

External links
2014 Chicago White Sox at Baseball Reference
2014 Chicago White Sox season Official Site
2014 Chicago White Sox season at ESPN

Chicago White Sox seasons
Chicago White Sox
White Sox